The Men's Double Advanced Metric Round Paraplegic was an archery competition in the 1984 Summer Paralympics.

The gold medalist was Belgian Guy Grun.

Results

References

1984 Summer Paralympics events